Miranda Caroline Raison (born 18 November 1977) is an English actress.

Early life

Miranda Raison was born in Burnham Thorpe, Norfolk, on 18 November 1977. Her mother is former Anglia News reader Caroline Raison (née Harvey).  Her father, Nick Raison, is a jazz pianist who accompanied the BBC National Orchestra of Wales when Raison played a showgirl in the Doctor Who episodes "Daleks in Manhattan" and "Evolution of the Daleks".

Raison's parents divorced when she was five years old. From a young age she attended five boarding schools, including Gresham's School, Felixstowe College and Stowe School; her education was paid for by her grandfather.

It was at Felixstowe College where she developed an interest in acting; she moved there after experiencing bullying at her previous school. She trained at the Webber Douglas Academy of Dramatic Art.

Career

Theatre
In 1999, she played the role of June Stanley in the play The Man Who Came to Dinner.

In 2000, Raison played Desdemona in William Shakespeare's Othello at the Theatre Royal, York.

From 27 February to 7 April 2001, she performed in the role of Davina in the farce Don't Just Lie There, Say Something! (originally titled Whitehall Farce) at The Mill, Sonning.

From 2002–3, she appeared as Ben-Hur's love interest in a minimalist production of the eponymous play at the Battersea Arts Centre. Later in 2003, she was featured in Pains of Youth, again at the Battersea Arts Centre, playing the death obsessed bisexual Desiree; Lyn Gardner of The Guardian described her performance as making "Desiree's death wish seem tragic rather than merely silly."

In 2010 she played the title role in Anne Boleyn, a new play by Howard Brenton, who had also been involved in scripts for BBC's Spooks in which Raison went on to appear in 5 series, which premiered at Shakespeare's Globe on 24 July 2010 to high critical acclaim. In the same Shakespeare's Globe season Raison also played Anne Boleyn in Henry VIII by William Shakespeare.

In 2011, she appeared as Ann in the short play "Oliver Lewis" by Jack Thorne, part of the series of plays 66 Books performed at the Bush Theatre.

In June/July 2012 she appeared in a production of The Physicists: A Comedy in Two Acts at the Donmar Warehouse, playing the roles of Lina Rose, the lead character's ex-wife, and Monika Settler, the lead's attending nurse. From October 2012 Raison starred in The River, a new play by Jez Butterworth, at the Royal Court Theatre (Jerwood) alongside Dominic West. Tickets became "the most sought-after theatre tickets in London" after rave reviews.

In 2013–14 she played Anne Faulkner in the theatrical version of Strangers on a Train at the Gielgud Theatre, produced by Barbara Broccoli.

From January to February 2015, she starred opposite Shaun Evans in Hello/Goodbye at the Hampstead Theatre. In August 2015 she joined the Kenneth Branagh Theatre Company in The Winter's Tale and Harlequinade which ran at the Garrick Theatre from October 2015 until January 2016. Raison played the wife of Kenneth Branagh's character in both plays. She stated that she enjoyed the experience and was grateful for the opportunity, given that previously she had a bad audition with Branagh for Macbeth in 2011. She also enjoyed learning from Judi Dench.

Film and television
Raison's first film role in 2000 was playing Marianne Faithfull in Suzy Q alongside Carice Van Houten

In 2004, Raison was cast as 'Heather' in Match Point, the first Woody Allen film to be made in London.

In 2005, she appeared in Deuce Bigalow: European Gigolo, which she said "may as well have been the most brutal Lars von Trier film. Another actress and I actually spent a whole night just crying." She called the experience "regrettable from start to finish" and a "hideous, hideous moment and a great lapse of judgement on my part".

Raison's breakthrough role was as Jo Portman (2005–2009) in the BBC One television drama series Spooks (also broadcast under the title MI-5). She requested that the production company let her go in 2009 as she felt that her character could not develop further and wanted to follow up on theatre opportunities.

In April 2007 she appeared in the Doctor Who episodes "Daleks in Manhattan" and "Evolution of the Daleks" as Tallulah, a show girl whose opening scene involved singing to a musical number, for which Raison's father played the piano background as part of the BBC National Orchestra of Wales.

In 2009, she was featured in the show Plus One. She was originally featured in the Comedy Showcase pilot in 2007, where she wore a fat suit.

In 2010 after leaving Spooks, she played a model called Abbey in the ITV1 comedy-drama Married Single Other.

She had a small role in My Week with Marilyn. She expressed pleasure in being able to work with great British talent and her fascination with Marilyn Monroe.

In 2012 she played DI Georgina Dixon in the second series of Vexed, screened on BBC2.

In 2013 she played 'Harriet Hammond' in the third series of the BBC legal drama Silk; her character was a practice manager who shook up the firm and a potential love interest for her former Spooks co-star Rupert Penry-Jones' character.

In 2014, she had a small role in I Am Soldier, playing "Stella", the lead interrogator in the "Tactical Questioning" portion of the lead character's training.    
 
In July 2014 she was announced as a new cast member of Spotless, a (10 × 1 hour episode) drama produced by Canal+.

In 2018, Raison reprised her role as ‘Sylvie’ in 6 episodes of Dark Heart, played xenobiologist ‘Tessia’ in 6 episodes of Nightflyers and appeared in Artemis Fowl.

In May 2019 it was announced that Raison would be joining the main cast of Warrior for the second season.

In September 2021 it was announced that Raison had joined the first series of Sister Boniface Mysteries playing Ruth Penny, a main character across all ten episodes.

Raison is set to reprise her role as 'Nellie Davenport', as part of the main cast of the third season of Warrior which will begin filming in the summer of 2022.

Other works

In 2005 she appeared in the BBC radio comedy Deep Trouble. She has voiced several video game characters, including Cassandra Pentaghast in the Dragon Age series, Lieutenant Sandra Lansing in Apache: Air Assault and Natasha and other characters in Renegade Ops. BioWare also hired Raison for providing several voices in Mass Effect: Andromeda. She voiced three characters in The Secret World and lent her voice for Dreamfall Chapters and Blades of Time. 
 
Raison has also voice-acted in several Big Finish Doctor Who audios, including The Davros Mission and The Wreck of the Titan, and plays Constance Clarke, a regular companion to the Sixth Doctor. She also provides additional voices in other Big Finish audio productions, including other Doctor Who stories and The Avengers.
 
In 2013 she joined the CGI series cast of Thomas & Friends and provides the voice of Millie (UK/US), first introduced in King of the Railway.
 
Since July 2017 she has been narrating the BBC2 documentary Hospital.

Personal life
She plays golf and is a member of the Aldeburgh Golf Club.

While separated from her first husband, Raza Jaffrey, she began a relationship with her Married Single Other co-star Ralf Little in November 2009, which ended in February 2013.

She married again in 2017 to Christopher Mollard and had a daughter in that same year.

She speaks fluent French and is conversational in Italian and Spanish.

Raison is distantly related to Jack Huston. Her cousin, Paul Raison, was a Chairman of Christie's.

Filmography and voice over

References

External links

 

Living people
1977 births
People educated at Gresham's School
People educated at Stowe School
Alumni of the Webber Douglas Academy of Dramatic Art
Actors from Norfolk
English film actresses
English stage actresses
English television actresses
English video game actresses
English voice actresses
21st-century English actresses